José Brasa (Vigo, Spain, 1951) is a Spanish born coach. He is the current coach of Old Club Liège Hockey in Belgium. 

He's known as the only coach who ever won an Olympic gold medal with Spain when he led the Spanish Women to the title in Barcelona, 1992. He also coached the India men's national field hockey team. He was preceded by Joaquim Carvalho. He coached the Indian team till the 2010 Asian Games in Guangzhou. He was unceremoniously sacked by Hockey India in 2010. In the World Series Hockey organised by the Indian Hockey Federation and Nimbus Sport, Brasa coaches the Chennai Cheetahs, a Chennai-based Hockey team, in the league. He did also coach the Ukraine women's national field hockey team.

References

Living people
Spanish field hockey coaches
Spanish expatriates in India
1951 births